Scopula dismutata is a moth of the family Geometridae. It is endemic to Brazil.

References

Moths described in 1858
Moths of South America
dismutata
Taxa named by Achille Guenée